The 2008–09 season was the 85th season in the existence of AEK Athens F.C. and the 50th consecutive season in the top flight of Greek football. They competed in the Super League, the Greek Cup and the UEFA Cup. The season began on 14 August 2008 and finished on 31 May 2009.

Overview
After the end of an indifferent season, AEK Athens initially finished in first place in the league, but after the court case between Apollon Kalamarias and Olympiacos for the illegal use of Roman Wallner in the 1-0 Apollon Kalamarias win earlier in the season, Olympiacos were awarded the 3 points in a court hearing, thus finishing 2 points ahead of AEK. AEK then finished 2nd in the play-offs which found them qualify for the UEFA Cup.

The club sold 18,200 season tickets. The new season started nervously, since the team was constantly underperforming during friendly matches. The apparent nervousness reached a new high, when the team was defeated at home by underdogs Omonia at the first leg of the Second qualifying round of the UEFA Cup, followed by the resignation announcement by the chairman Demis Nikolaidis at the end of the season and the sudden intention of Rivaldo to leave the club in order to join Bunyodkor from Uzbekistan. AEK were eventually eliminated from the UEFA Cup. Despite the disappointment, the team responded surprisingly well and put an assertive performance against fierce rivals Panathinaikos by beating them 2-1 at home in the first matchday, but poor performances and results from then on left AEK in a difficult situation. Head coach Giorgos Donis was eager to leave the club, but Nikolaidis did not allow him to leave. Nevertheless, Nikolaidis left due to these disappointing results and after a controversy with the club's ultras, Original 21, leaving the presidency to members of the D.C., Nikos Koulis and Takis Kanellopoulos.

However, the series of disappointing results continued, bringing anger and insecure situations for everyone in the team. The first to be hit by this wave of disappointment and with the council of the team upset, was the coach Giorgos Donis, who was asked to leave the team. On November 21, 2008, AEK hired Dušan Bajević as head coach for the third time.

On 2 May 2009, AEK reached the Greek Cup final at Athens Olympic Stadium in an effort to win the title for 14th time. However, the result did not go in their favour after losing 14-15 on penalties to their arch rival, Olympiacos.

Events
 14 May: Giorgos Donis replaces Nikos Kostenoglou as head manager.
 16 May: Midfielder Antonis Rikka agrees to join AEK from Skoda Xanthi
 20 May: Defender Daniel Majstorović agrees to join AEK from Basel
 5 June: Midfielder Dániel Tőzsér joins Genk
 1 July: Goalkeeper Sebastián Saja agrees to join AEK from San Lorenzo de Almagro
 1 July: Striker Nacho Scocco agrees to join AEK from Club Universidad Nacional
 1 July: Striker Nathan Burns agrees to join AEK from Adelaide United
 1 July: Midfielder Júlio César signs for Rapid București on a free transfer
 1 July: Striker Pantelis Kapetanos is released from the club after his contract expired.
 3 July: Goalkeeper Stefano Sorrentino joins Chievo on loan until the end of the season.
 7 July: Striker Nikos Liberopoulos is released from the club.
 23 July: Defender Traianos Dellas is released from the club.
 30 July: Defender Juanfran agrees to join AEK from Real Zaragoza
 31 July: Midfielder Angelos Basinas agrees to join AEK from Mallorca
 1 August: Defender Sotirios Kyrgiakos agrees to join AEK from Eintracht Frankfurt
 1 August: AEK is drawn against Omonia in the UEFA Cup Second qualifying round
 2 August: Defender Sokratis Papastathopoulos joins Genoa
 22 August: Chairman Demis Nikolaidis announces his intention to resign from his position at the end of the season.
 27 August: Midfielder Rivaldo joins FC Bunyodkor.
 30 August: Striker Rafik Djebbour agrees to join AEK from Panionios
 1 September: Midfielder Agustín Pelletieri agrees to join AEK on loan from Lanús
 2 November: Chairman Demis Nikolaidis resigns as president of AEK
 5 November: Takis Kanellopoulos and Nikos Koulis take temporary charge of the club
 17 November: AEK part ways with manager Giorgos Donis
 21 November: Stelios Manolas becomes technical director of the club
 21 November: Dušan Bajević becomes manager for the third time
 1 December: Georgios Kintis becomes 43rd president of AEK.
 27 January: Defender Edson Ratinho joins Mogi Mirim
 2 February: Midfielder Angelos Basinas joins Portsmouth

Players

Squad information

NOTE: The players are the ones that have been announced by the AEK Athens' press release. No edits should be made unless a player arrival or exit is announced. Updated 30 June 2009, 23:59 UTC+3.

Transfers

In

Summer

Winter

Out

Summer

Winter

Loan in

Summer

Loan out

Summer

Winter

Notes

 a.  plus 15% of next sale.

Renewals

Overall transfer activity

Expenditure
Summer:  €7,650,000

Winter:  €0

Total:  €7,650,000

Income
Summer:  €6,560,000

Winter:  €350,000

Total:  €6,910,000

Net Totals
Summer:  €1,090,000

Winter:  €350,000

Total:  €740,000

Club

Management

Kit

|

|

|

Other information

Manager stats

Only competitive matches are counted. Wins, losses and draws are results at the final whistle; the results of penalty shootouts are not counted.

Pre-season and friendlies

Super League Greece

Regular season

League table

Results summary

Results by Matchday

Fixtures

Play-offs

Results by Matchday

Fixtures

Greek Cup

AEK entered the Greek Cup at the Round of 32.

Matches

Quarter-finals

Semi-finals

Final

UEFA Cup

Second qualifying round

UEFA rankings

Statistics

Squad statistics

! colspan="15" style="background:#FFDE00; text-align:center" | Goalkeepers
|-

! colspan="15" style="background:#FFDE00; color:black; text-align:center;"| Defenders
|-

! colspan="15" style="background:#FFDE00; color:black; text-align:center;"| Midfielders
|-

! colspan="15" style="background:#FFDE00; color:black; text-align:center;"| Forwards
|-

! colspan="15" style="background:#FFDE00; color:black; text-align:center;"| Left during Summer Transfer Window
|-

! colspan="15" style="background:#FFDE00; color:black; text-align:center;"| Left during Winter Transfer Window
|-

|-
|}

Disciplinary record

|-
! colspan="20" style="background:#FFDE00; text-align:center" | Goalkeepers

|-
! colspan="20" style="background:#FFDE00; color:black; text-align:center;"| Defenders

|-
! colspan="20" style="background:#FFDE00; color:black; text-align:center;"| Midfielders

|-
! colspan="20" style="background:#FFDE00; color:black; text-align:center;"| Forwards

|-
! colspan="20" style="background:#FFDE00; color:black; text-align:center;"| Left during Summer Transfer window

|-
! colspan="20" style="background:#FFDE00; color:black; text-align:center;"| Left during Winter Transfer window

|-
|}

Starting 11

References

External links
AEK Athens F.C. Official Website
AEK Athens FC on Superleaguegreece.net

Greek football clubs 2008–09 season
2008-09